The Atlantic Steel Company was a steel company in Atlanta, Georgia with a large steel mill on the site of today's Atlantic Station multi-use complex.

Atlantic Steel's history dated back to 1901 when it was founded as the Atlanta Hoop Company, with 120 employees, and which produced cotton bale ties and barrel hoops. It became the Atlanta Steel Company, and then in December 1915, the Atlantic Steel Company.

From 1908-1922 Thomas K. Glenn was the company's president. A replica of his office exists at the Millennium Gate museum in Atlantic Station.

By 1952, the plant had 2,100 employees and was producing not only hoops and ties, but also "poultry and field fence, barbed wire, angles, round bars, channels, tees, handrail, reinforcing bars, nails, rivets, welding rods, shackles, [forgings] and fence posts".

The plant's "deep-throated" steam whistle was named "Mr. Tom", after Tom Glenn, an early president of the company.

In 1979, the Ivaco company of Montreal, Quebec, Canada acquired Atlantic Steel. Operations were partially shut down in the 1980s as competition from home and abroad intensified.

In 1997, of the 1,400 employees in 1979, there were only 400 remaining.

In 1998, Jacoby Development purchased the complex for about 76 million USD, tore down the complex, cleaned up the site and built Atlantic Station in its place.

References

External links
 1998-9 images of Atlantic Steel
 "The Atlantic Steel Company", Atlantic Station Living
Hal Jacobs, "Forging a forgotten century", Creative Loafing, December 12, 1998

History of Atlanta
Ironworks and steel mills in the United States
Steel companies of the United States
Demolished buildings and structures in Atlanta
Industrial landmarks in Atlanta
Buildings and structures demolished in 1998